The Cook County Sheriff is the sheriff of Cook County, Illinois, heading the Cook County Sheriff's Office.

Office description
Terms are currently four-years in length.

Officeholders

Recent election results

|-
| colspan=16 style="text-align:center;" |Cook County Sheriff general elections
|-
!Year
!Winning candidate
!Party
!Vote (pct)
!Opponent
!Party
! Vote (pct)
!Opponent
!Party
! Vote (pct)
!Opponent
!Party
! Vote (pct)
|-
|1986
| | James E. O'Grady
| | Democratic
| | 706,659 (51.12%)
| | Richard J. Elrod
| | Democratic
| | 673,233 (48.79%)
| 
| 
| 
| 
| 
| 
|-
|1990
| | Michael F. Sheahan
| | Democratic
| | 719,489 (55.41%)
| | James E. O'Grady
| | Republican
| | 369,631	(28.47%)
|Text style="background:#D2B48C | Tommy Brewer
|Text style="background:#D2B48C | Harold Washington Party
|Text style="background:#D2B48C | 191,101 (14.72%)
|Text style="background:#008000 | William M. Piechuch, Sr.
|Text style="background:#008000 | Illinois Solidarity
|Text style="background:#008000 | 18,318 (1.41%)
|-
|1994
| | Michael F. Sheahan
| | Democratic
| | 
| | John D. Tourtelot
| | Republican
| | 
|Text style="background:#D2B48C | William A. Brown
|Text style="background:#D2B48C | Harold Washington Party
|Text style="background:#D2B48C | 
| William J. Benson
| Populist
| 
|-
|1998
| | Michael F. Sheahan
| | Democratic
| | 903,053 (71.11%)
| | LeRoy Martin
| | Republican
| | 366,867 (28.89%)
| 
| 
| 
| 
| 
| 
|-
|2002
| | Michael F. Sheahan
| | Democratic
| | 984,348 (76.88%)
| | Ronald Swick
| | Republican
| | 296,062 (23.12%)
| 
| 
| 
| 
| 
| 
|-
|2006
| | Tom Dart
| | Democratic
| | 942,113 (74.70%)
| | Peter Garza
| | Republican
| | 319,011 (25.30%)
| 
| 
| 
| 
| 
| 
|-
|2010
| | Tom Dart
| | Democratic
| | 1,041,696 (77.26%)
| | Frederick Collins
| | Republican
| | 257,682 (19.11%)
| | Marshall P. Lewis
| | Green
| | 48,930 (3.63%)
| 
| 
| 
|-
|2014
| | Tom Dart
| | Democratic
| | 1,055,783 (100%)
| 
| 
| 
| 
| 
| 
| 
| 
| 
|-
|2018
| | Tom Dart
| | Democratic
| | 1,455,825 (100%)
| 
| 
| 
| 
| 
| 
| 
| 
| 
|-
|2022
| |Tom Dart
| | Democratic
| |1,041,525 (74.21%)
| | Lupe Aguirre
| | Republican
| | 321,252 (22.89%)
| | Brad Sandefur
| | Libertarian
| | 40,752 (2.90%)
| 
| 
|

References